Sons of Steel is a 1989 Australian sci-fi fantasy musical film written, directed and composed by Gary L. Keady and produced by James M. Vernon.

Plot
The film is set in Australia, where an accidental future time traveler finds himself going back in time to change events to prevent a calamity. It stars Rob Hartley as Black Alice (who performed most of the songs for the movie) and Australian musician Jeff Duff (who sang "The Burn").

Cast
Rob Hartley as Black Alice
Roz Wason as Hope
Jeff Duff as Secta
Dagmar Bláhová as Honor
Ralph Cotterill as Karzoff
Elizabeth Richmond as Djard
Wayne Snell as Ex
Mark Hembrow as Mal

Production
The film is based on an original short called "Knightmare", written, co-directed and music directed by Gary L. Keady and co-directed by Yahoo Serious. Gary Keady developed the script for Sons of Steel from the short film, and the feature was shot in 1988. The short film was shown before David Lynch's Dune in theatres, and it received enough notice for major producers to show interest in turning it into a feature.

Release
The film had a box office release in 1989. Gary Keady and Nicholas Huxley were nominated for an Australian Film Institute (AFI) Award for best costume design for Sons of Steel in 1989, and the film was nominated for best original Australian soundtrack at the ARIA Music Awards of 1990.

Sons of Steel premiered at the 1988 Cannes Film Festival and was released in thirty two countries. It won official selection at the Brussels International Festival of Fantastic Film and was a finalist at the Festival of the Imagination, Clermont Ferrand, France in 1989.

Accolades
Nicola Braithwaite, Nicholas Huxley and Gary L. Keady were nominated for Best Costume Design at the 1989 AFI Awards.

References

External links 
 Official Website
 
 Sons of Steel trailer

1989 films
Australian science fiction films
Science fiction musical films
1980s English-language films
1980s Australian films